A non-aggression pact or neutrality pact is a treaty between two or more states/countries that includes a promise by the signatories not to engage in military action against each other. Such treaties may be described by other names, such as a treaty of friendship or non-belligerency, etc. Leeds, Ritter, Mitchell, & Long (2002) distinguish between a non-aggression pact and a neutrality pact. They posit that a non-aggression pact includes the promise not to attack the other pact signatories, whereas a neutrality pact includes a promise to avoid support of any entity that acts against the interests of any of the pact signatories. The most readily recognized example of the  aforementioned entity is another country, nation-state, or sovereign organization that represents a negative consequence towards the advantages held by one or more of the signatory parties.

History 
In the 19th century neutrality pacts have historically been used to give permission for one signatory of the pact to attack or attempt to negatively influence an entity not protected by the neutrality pact. The participants of the neutrality pact agree not to attempt to counteract an act of aggression waged by a pact signatory towards an entity not protected under the terms of the pact. Possible motivations for such acts by one or more of the pacts' signatories include a desire to take, or expand, control of economic resources, militarily important locations, etc.

The 1939 Molotov–Ribbentrop Pact between the Soviet Union and Nazi Germany is perhaps the best-known example of a non-aggression pact. The Pact lasted until the 1941 German invasion of the Soviet Union in Operation Barbarossa. However, such pacts may be a device for neutralising a potential military threat, enabling at least one of the signatories to free up its military resources for other purposes. For example, the Molotov–Ribbentrop Pact freed German resources from the Russian front. On the other hand, the Soviet–Japanese Neutrality Pact, signed on April 13, 1941, removed the threat from Japan in the east enabling the Soviets to move large forces from Siberia to the fight against the Germans, which had a direct bearing on the Battle of Moscow.

The Alliance Treaty Obligations and Provisions (ATOP) dataset records 185 agreements that are solely non-aggression pacts between 1815 and 2018. According to this data, 29 such pacts were recorded in the interwar period with spikes in occurrences in 1960, 1970, 1979, and especially the early 1990s where a number of Eastern European states signed pacts following the fall of the Soviet Union.

States with a history of rivalry tend to sign non-aggression pacts in order to prevent future conflict with one another. The pacts often facilitate information exchange which reduce uncertainty that might lead to conflict. Additionally, the pact signals to third party nations that the rivalry has reduced and that peaceful relations is desired. It has been found that major powers are more likely to start military conflicts against their partners in non-aggression pacts than against states that do not have any sort of alliance with them.

List of non-aggression pacts

Other usage 
The term has colloquial usage outside the field of international relations. In the context of association football, the term can imply a deliberate lack of aggression between two teams, such as at the Disgrace of Gijón, which, in Germany, is known as the Nichtangriffspakt von Gijón (lit. "Non-aggression pact of Gijón"). A non-aggression pact can also be a formal agreement or gentlemen's agreement limiting transfers for players between two or more clubs.

See also 
Treaty of Friendship
List of treaties
Peace treaty

References